De Veyra is a surname. Notable people with the surname include:

Jaime C. de Veyra (1873–1963), Filipino politician, lawyer, historian, linguist, and educator
Sofia de Veyra (1876–1953), Filipina feminist, clubwoman, teacher, and school founder
Lourd de Veyra (born 1975), Filipino musician, singer, poet, and journalist